Raymore–Peculiar High School (Ray-Pec) is a public high school in Peculiar, Missouri. It is a part of the Raymore-Peculiar School District. The school's mascot is the Panther, and the official colors are black, white, and gold. It is also a participant in Missouri's A+ Program.

The boundary of its school district, and therefore its attendance boundary, includes sections of Cass County, Missouri. This includes all of Peculiar and Raymore as well as an eastern portion of Belton, sections of Lee's Summit, and much of Lake Winnebago, as well as unincorporated areas.

It is commonly referred to as "Ray-Pec."

Academics

Dual-Credit
Raymore–Peculiar High School is also a participant in the dual-credit program, where students earn high school credit and also college credit hours. These courses range from college-level Spanish to Calculus or English. Participating post-secondary institutions include UMKC, the University of Central Missouri, and the MCCKC.

AP Credit
The high school is also a participant in the Advanced Placement program, which offers university-level material to gifted/motivated student. Multiple courses are offered for exam preparation, including:

 AP Biology
 AP Chemistry
 AP World History
 AP US Government and Politics
 AP English Language and Composition
 AP English Literature and Composition
 AP Studio Art
 AP Music Theory

For foreign language students, the AP French Language and AP Spanish Language (through independent study) courses are also available.

IB Credit
Students may choose to enroll in IB (International Baccalaureate) courses and graduate with an IB certificate(s) or IB diploma. The IB program is made for students all around the world and is extremely rigorous.

Notable alumni
Chase Coffman - former NFL tight end
Carson Coffman - Arena Football League player

References

External links
Raymore-Peculiar School District

High schools in Cass County, Missouri
Public high schools in Missouri
Raymore, Missouri